Anton Ivanovich Is Angry is a 1941 Soviet comedy film directed by Aleksandr Ivanovsky.

Plot 
The film tells about the musician Anton Ivanovich, who performs exclusively works by J.S.Bach, and his daughter, who studies music at conservatory. She falls in love with a young composer, creating operettas, which Anton Ivanovich dislikes. The plot hinges on whether the professor can accept his daughter's devotion to 'light genre' and her  relationship with the composer.

Starring 
 Nikolai Konovalov as Anton Ivanovich Voronov (as N. Konovalov)
 Lyudmila Tselikovskaya as Serafima "Sima" Antonovna Voronova
 Pavel Kadochnikov as Aleksei Petrovich Mukhin
  as Jakov Grigoryevich Kirbik (as A. Orlov)
 Tamara Pavlotskaya as Yadviga Valentinovna Kholodetskaya (as T. Pavlotskaya)
 Tamara Glebova as Natalya Mikhailovna Voronva (as T. Glebova)
 Tatyana Kondrakova as Dina Antonovna Voronova
 Sergey Martinson as Kerosinov (as Sergei Martinson)
 Anatoly Korolkevich as Stephan Stepanovich Skvoreshnikov
 Vladimir Gardin as Johann Sebastian Bach
 Vitaliy Kilchevskiy as Unidentified Player [Cast Name: Rollandov] (as V. Kilchevskii)
 Glikeriya Bogdanova-Chesnokova

References

External links 
 

1941 films
1940s Russian-language films
Soviet comedy films
1941 comedy films
Soviet black-and-white films